Galten may refer to:

 Galten (basin), a basin in Lake Mälaren in Sweden
 Galten, Denmark, a former railway town in eastern Jutland
 Galten Municipality, a former municipality in Denmark
 Galten Islands, a small group of islands in Antarctica
 RG-32M Galten, a mine-resistant armoured vehicle